, sometimes used interchangeably with the modern term , is the martial art strategy and tactics of unconventional warfare, guerrilla warfare and espionage purportedly practised by the ninja. Ninjutsu was a separate discipline in some traditional Japanese schools, which integrated study of more conventional martial arts (taijutsu) along with shurikenjutsu, kenjutsu, sōjutsu, bōjutsu and others.

While there is an international martial arts organization representing several modern styles of ninjutsu, the historical lineage of these styles is disputed. Some schools claim to be the only legitimate heir of the art, but ninjutsu is not centralized like modernized martial arts such as judo or karate. Togakure-ryū claims to be the oldest recorded form of ninjutsu, and claims to have survived past the 16th century.

History

Spying in Japan dates as far back as Prince Shōtoku (572–622). According to Shōninki, the first open usage of ninjutsu during a military campaign was in the Genpei War, when Minamoto no Kuro Yoshitsune chose warriors to serve as shinobi during a battle. This manuscript goes on to say that during the Kenmu era, Kusunoki Masashige frequently used ninjutsu. According to footnotes in this manuscript, the Genpei War lasted from 1180 to 1185, and the Kenmu Restoration occurred between 1333 and 1336. Ninjutsu was developed by the samurai of the Nanboku-cho period, and further refined by groups of samurai mainly from Kōka and the Iga Province of Japan in later periods. 

Throughout history, the shinobi were assassins, scouts, and spies who were hired mostly by territorial lords known as daimyō. Despite being able to assassinate in stealth, the primary role was as spies and scouts. Shinobi are mainly noted for their use of stealth and deception. They would use this to avoid direct confrontation if possible, which enabled them to escape large groups of opposition.

Many different schools (ryū) have taught their unique versions of ninjutsu. An example of these is the Togakure-ryū, which claims to have been developed after a defeated samurai warrior called Daisuke Togakure escaped to the region of Iga. He later came in contact with the warrior-monk Kain Doshi, who taught him a new way of viewing life and the means of survival (ninjutsu).

Ninjutsu was developed as a collection of fundamental survivalist techniques in the warring state of feudal Japan. The ninja used their art to ensure their survival in a time of violent political turmoil. Ninjutsu included methods of gathering information and techniques of non-detection, avoidance, and misdirection. Ninjutsu involved training in disguise, escape, concealment, archery, and medicine. Skills relating to espionage and assassination were highly useful to warring factions in feudal Japan. At some point, the skills of espionage became known collectively as ninjutsu, and the people who specialized in these tasks were called shinobi no mono.

See also
 Kunoichi
 Ninjas in popular culture

References

Further reading

 
 Borda, Remigiusz. The Illustrated Ninja Handbook: Hidden Techniques of Ninjutsu. Tokyo–Rutland, Vt.–Singapore: Tuttle, 2014.
 Callos, Tom. "Notable American Martial Artists", Black Belt Magazine, May 2007, pp. 72–73.
 DiMarzio, Daniel. A Story of Life, Fate, and Finding the Lost Art of Koka Ninjutsu in Japan, 2008. 
 Green, T. A. and J. R. Svinth. Martial Arts of the World: An Encyclopedia of History and Innovation. Santa Barbara, Calif.: ABC-CLIO, 2010.
 Hatsumi, Masaaki. Ninjutsu: History and Tradition, 1981. 
 Hatsumi, Masaaki. Ninpo: Wisdom for Life, 1998. , 
 Hayes, Stephen K. and Masaaki Hatsumi. Secrets from the Ninja Grandmaster, rev. ed. Boulder, Colo.: Paladin Press, 2003. 
 Hatsumi, Masaaki. Essence of Ninjutsu, 1988. 
 
 
 Toshitora, Yamashiro. Secret Guide to Making Ninja Weapons, Butokukai Press, 1986. 
 Zoughari, Kacem. The Ninja: Ancient Shadow Warriors of Japan, Tuttle Publishing, 2010.

External links

 Ninjutsu techniques – ninjutsu kata and techniques in the AKBAN wiki
 Ninjutsu history – history of Ninjutsu and its evolution

 
Japanese martial arts